Cory Gilliard (born October 10, 1974) is a former American football defensive back. He played for the Cincinnati Bengals in 1997 and for the Orlando Rage in 2001.

References

1974 births
Living people
American football defensive backs
Ball State Cardinals football players
Cincinnati Bengals players
Frankfurt Galaxy players
Orlando Rage players